Religion News Service (RNS) is a news agency covering religion, ethics, spirituality and moral issues. It publishes news, information, and commentaries on faiths and religious movements to newspapers, magazines, broadcast organizations and religious publications. It was founded in 1934.

History

RNS was founded in 1934 by journalist Louis Minsky as an affiliate of the National Conference of Christians and Jews. Everett R. Clinchy was the managing editor and co-founder.

RNS was acquired by the United Methodist Reporter in 1983, by Newhouse News Service in 1994, then by the Religion Newswriters Foundation in 2011.

In April 2015, the Catholic News Agency published an article disclosing that RNS had received a grant of $120,000 from the Arcus Foundation with the stated intent “to recruit and equip LGBT supportive leaders and advocates to counter rejection and antagonism within traditionally conservative Christian churches”, also questioning if the grant had biased RNS's coverage of traditional religion. In response, RNS's then editor-in-chief Kevin Eckstrom said that the grant language is “Arcus’ description of their funding, not ours” and denied that the grant had any influence over editorial decisions at RNS.

See also 
:Category:LGBT and Christianity

References

External links
 

1934 establishments in the United States
Religious organizations established in 1934
News agencies based in the United States
Religious mass media in the United States